Thomas Francis Smith (July 24, 1865 – April 11, 1923) was a lawyer, newspaperman, and politician from New York. From 1917 to 1921, he served two terms in the U.S. House of Representatives.

Biography
Smith was born in New York City on July 24, 1865.  He attended St. Francis Xavier College, Manhattan College, and the New York Law School from 1899 to 1901.  He subsequently became a reporter on the staff of the New York World and the New York Tribune, and then a clerk of the city court in 1898–1917.  Smith was admitted to the bar in 1911 and commenced practice in New York City.

Political career 
Smith began his political career as a delegate to the State constitutional convention in 1915 and to the Democratic National Convention in 1916.  He was elected as a Democrat to the Sixty-fifth United States Congress to fill the vacancy caused by the death of Michael F. Conry, and was reelected to the Sixty-sixth, to serve from April 12, 1917, to March 3, 1921.  Smith was not a candidate for renomination in 1920.

Later career and death 
After Congress, Smith became the public administrator of New York from April 1, 1921, until his death in a taxicab accident in New York City on April 11, 1923.  Smith was interred in Calvary Cemetery, in Long Island City, New York.

Sources

External links

  
 

1865 births
1923 deaths
Burials at Calvary Cemetery (Queens)
Manhattan College alumni
New York Law School alumni
New York (state) lawyers
Road incident deaths in New York City
Democratic Party members of the United States House of Representatives from New York (state)
19th-century American lawyers